VGH may refer to any of:

 Vancouver General Hospital in Vancouver, British Columbia
 Victoria General Hospital in Victoria, British Columbia
 Victoria General Hospital (Winnipeg) in Winnipeg, Manitoba
Verwaltungsgerichtshof, the High Administrative Court in some German states
Volksgerichtshof, the People's Court of Nazi Germany

See also
 Queen Elizabeth II Health Sciences Centre in Halifax, Nova Scotia, formerly named Victoria General Hospital